Jordan Creek may refer to:

Streams
 Jordan Creek (Eel River), a stream in Indiana
 Jordan Creek (Johnson County, Iowa)
 Jordan Creek (Minnesota), a stream in Fillmore County
 Jordan Creek (Lindley Creek), a stream in Missouri
 Jordan Creek (Little Third Fork), a stream in Missouri
 Jordan Creek (Sinking Creek), a stream in Missouri
 Jordan Creek (Owyhee River), in Idaho and Oregon
 Jordan Creek (Pennsylvania), a tributary of Little Lehigh Creek
 Jordan Creek (Washington), a tributary of the Cascade River
 Jordan Creek (Georgia), a tributary of the Ocmulgee River

Other uses
 Jordan Creek and Jordan Creek 2, memory buffer chips used in conjunction with Intel Xeon E7 processors
 Jordan Creek, Oregon, an unincorporated community
 Jordan Creek Town Center, a shopping center in West Des Moines, Iowa

See also
 Jordan (disambiguation)
 Jordan River (disambiguation)